The 1975 Coupe de France Final was a football match held at Parc des Princes, Paris on 14 June 1975, that saw AS Saint-Étienne defeat RC Lens 2–0 thanks to goals by Oswaldo Piazza and Jean-Michel Larqué.

Match details

See also
Coupe de France 1974-75

External links
Coupe de France results at Rec.Sport.Soccer Statistics Foundation
Report on French federation site

Coupe
1975
Coupe De France Final 1975
Coupe De France Final 1975
Coupe de France Final
Coupe de France Final